Robert Fico (born 15 September 1964) is a Slovak politician who served as the prime minister of Slovakia from 2006 to 2010 and from 2012 to 2018 (when he resigned). He has been the first leader of the Direction – Social Democracy (SMER-SD) party since 1999.  First elected to Parliament in 1992 (whilst within Czechoslovakia), he was later appointed to the Council of Europe.  Following his party's victory in the 2006 parliamentary election, he formed the first Fico Cabinet.

After the 2010 parliamentary election, Fico sat as an opposition member of parliament, effectively as leader of the opposition.  Following a motion of confidence against the Iveta Radičová cabinet, Fico was re-appointed as Prime Minister after leading SMER-SD to a landslide election victory in the 2012 parliamentary election, winning 83 seats and forming a government with an absolute majority in Parliament, the first such since 1989. In 2013, Fico officially declared his candidacy for the 2014 presidential election. Fico lost the election to his political rival Andrej Kiska in the second round of voting on 29 March 2014.

On 15 March 2018, in the wake of the political crisis following the murder of Ján Kuciak, Fico delivered his resignation to President Andrej Kiska, who then formally charged Deputy Prime Minister Peter Pellegrini with the formation of a new government.

In April 2022, Robert Fico was accused by the Slovak National Crime Agency with founding and plotting a criminal group and was termed as its head. The National Council will decide by a relative majority on the detention of its member proposed by the prosecutor's office. The parliament did not find a majority in the decision, therefore Fico et al. will be investigated out of detention.

On 29 August 2022, during the celebration of the Slovak National Uprising, Fico invited the Russian diplomat Igor Bratchikov to speak on the stage. This was done despite the fact that Russia has put Slovakia on their black-list of countries after the Russian invasion of Ukraine.

Early life 
Fico was born on 15 September 1964, in the town of Topoľčany in the southwestern Nitra Region. His father, Ľudovit Fico, was a forklift operator, and his mother, Emilie Ficová, worked in a shoe store. He has two siblings; his brother Ladislav is a construction entrepreneur, and his sister Lucia Chabadová, who is fourteen years younger, is a prosecutor. Fico grew up and lived with his family in the village of Hrušovany, until the age of six, when they moved to the nearby town of Topoľčany.

Education 
Fico has described his childhood ambitions as wanting to become either a politician, a sports reporter, or an archeologist.  After completing elementary school, he enrolled in the local Gymnasium of Topoľčany, graduating in the summer of 1982.  Later the same year he enrolled in the Law Faculty of the Comenius University in Bratislava, in what was then Czechoslovakia.  His teachers were impressed with him, and one of his teachers from university, the future prime minister Jozef Moravčík, described him as "ambitious, very confident and very involved in discussions." He graduated as juris doctor in 1986 specializing in criminal law.

After graduating from university, Fico completed his mandatory military service as an assistant military investigator, stationed in the (now-Czech) town of Janovice between 1986 and 1987. He later worked for the Institute of State and Law of the Slovak Academy of Sciences, as well as with the Justice Ministry until 1992. During this period he wrote and completed his PhD degree, with a thesis on "The death penalty in Czechoslovakia" and, in the early 1990s, undertook studies at the School of Slavonic and East European Studies in London under a Masaryk scholarship. In 2002 he completed his postgraduate study, earning him the title of associate professor.

Early career (1992–2006) 
Fico joined the Communist Party of Czechoslovakia in 1986, having applied in 1984.  After the Velvet Revolution of 1989, and the collapse of the communist regime in Czechoslovakia, Fico joined the Party of the Democratic Left (SDĽ), a successor of the Communist Party of Slovakia.  He was first elected as a Member of Parliament in 1992. From 1994 to 2000 Fico represented Slovakia as its legal counsel at the European Court of Human Rights but lost all 14 cases which he handled. In 1998 he was elected deputy chairman of the party. Later the same year, Fico ran for the post of general prosecutor, but his party endorsed another candidate instead, arguing Fico was too young.

In the 1998 elections that saw the fall of the government of Vladimír Mečiar, Fico received the biggest number of preferential votes among his party colleagues.  A year later, when support for the SDĽ dropped below the threshold required to get into parliament, he left the party, saying he was disappointed with the way the government worked. Fico acted as an independent MP until the 2002 elections.

As early as in the autumn of 1998, a four-person group consisting of Fico, his associate Frantisek Határ, political strategist Fedor Flašík, and media executive Monika Flašíková-Beňová had begun to discuss and lay plans for launching a new political party on the left.  These plans were driven by the falling popularity of the existing parties, and the rising popularity of Fico.

Almost immediately after leaving SDĽ, the group founded Direction – Social Democracy (SMER), which Fico first labelled a party of the third way, with himself as leader.  Fico established himself as an opposition politician criticizing the unpopular reforms of the right-wing government of Mikuláš Dzurinda. In order to keep SMER from repeating the fate of his previous party, Fico introduced a strict set of regulations for his new party, called the "clean hands" policy.  The rules stipulated that no one with ties from the previous communist regime or people who had background with other political parties was allowed to hold party office.  This created a new generation of politicians uninvolved in previous corruption scandals; among them was Monika Flašíková-Beňová, Robert Kaliňák and Pavol Paška. Another rule was that all party chapters on the regional and local levels were to be 100% financially self-sufficient, and all financial donations were to be made public to the media.

Between 2002 and 2006 Smer was the main opposition party in the Slovak parliament.  In 2004, it merged with nearly all the leftist parties active on the Slovak political scene, including its parent party SDĽ, becoming the dominant single political party in Slovakia.

First premiership (2006–2010) 

In the elections in 2006 SMER won with 29.1% of the votes. The election victory came after a campaign focused on reversing the deeply un-popular austerity reforms within the healthcare and education sectors, reforms which were pushed through by then ministers Rudolf Zajac and Martin Fronc. They subsequently formed a coalition government with Vladimír Mečiar's People's Party – Movement for a Democratic Slovakia (HZDS) and Ján Slota's Slovak National Party (SNS). SNS is a right-wing populist party which has been known for making anti-Roma and anti-Hungarian comments, including a drunken public speech of Ján Slota, in which he threatened to "get in tanks and level Budapest to the ground."

One reaction to the coalition came from the EU-wide Party of European Socialists (PES), who suspended SMER's application to join the PES. In late February 2008, however, the Assembly of PES conditionally reinstated the application after both SMER and SNS signed a letter committing themselves to respect minority rights.

Fico has never publicly condemned SNS's remarks and speeches, and government-level relations between Slovakia and Hungary deteriorated in his first term in office. Several meetings between the two countries' prime ministers were abruptly cancelled, and those few that did take place resulted in little improvement of relations.

On April 10, 2007 the Deputy Director of the Slovak Land Fund and HZDS nominee Branislav Bríza signed a contract on the basis of which restitutors from eastern Slovakia became the owners of lucrative land in the Tatra village of Veľký Slavkov. These restritutors then quickly sold the land to the company GVM for 13 million Slovak crowns (Slovak currency prior to Euro). The figurehead of the company was a friend of Mečiar Milan Bališ. Bríza did so while his boss Hideghéty was on vacation. April 10 was the last day when Bríza had full power acting on behalf of his boss in the absence of his boss. This was the seventh suspicious contract he had signed up to that point. Such practices were previously criticized by Fico as they were common during the tenure of his Coalition partner HDZS leader Mečiar. This scandal almost led to the collapse of the Coalition. It led to the Minister of Agriculture for HDZS Miroslav Jureňa resigning. Fico demanded Bríza to resign. Estimated damange to the state was half a billion Slovak crowns. Justice was delivered on 8 September 2015 when Bríza was deemed guilty and sentenced to 2 years probation.

In May 2008 the Opposition party SDKÚ claimed that the liquidation balance in the amount of 650 million crowns of the state-owned joint-stock company Veriteľ, which in the past paid off the health sector's debt, was misused. The Vice-Chairman of SDKÚ Ivan Mikloš, referring to Trend's information, also drew attention to the fact that people and companies close to the Speaker of the Parliament Pavlo Pašek were doing business at exorbitant prices. The Opposition reacted with accusations to the report on the activities of Veriteľ from the Ministry of Finance, according to which the Veriteľ may have operated in a corrupt environment. The parliament postponed the discussion about it. The 22-million balance after the liquidation of the state-owned enterprise was apparently wasted in dubious ways at companies close to the government.

In August 2008 the Government decided which social ventures would receive millions of crown from the eurofunds Slovakia was getting. It turned out that 4 of them were under control of a friend of one of Smer's parliamentary Deputies. Juraj Thomka (the friend) denied that he had any connection to the business anymore at that point. The Minister of Labour also denied any accusation of clientelism.

Leader of the Opposition (2010–2012) 

Before the 2010 elections, Fico's party was in a relatively strong position according to several polls. However, just before the election a political scandal broke out, described as one of the gravest in the country's 17-year history. A voice recording surfaced in which a voice strongly resembling that of Fico claims that he raised several million euros in undeclared funds for the 2002 election as well as calling for a "parallel financial structure" to be created for the financing of Smer's election campaign. Slovak media sources such as SME carried the news about the recording in great detail; however, Fico dismissed it as a forgery.

Fico also attacked the media sources that published information about the recording, saying "Should I go over there and give you a smack because you are scoundrels? What you are doing is unheard of. You are masturbating on the prime minister every day." Fico has since been questioned on the matter, SME announced. Former Minister of Justice Daniel Lipšic told the press he has "handed the recording to the general attorney office." In the election, Fico's SMER remained the biggest party in Parliament, with 62 seats. However, his coalition partners were decimated, with the HZDS being completely shut out. Unable to find a partner willing to give him the 14 seats he needed to stay in office, Fico resigned. He said he "respects the election result" and expressed his desire to lead a resolute opposition after his narrow loss.

Second premiership (2012–2018)

2012 parliamentary election 

Following the fall of the centre-right coalition government that replaced his, Fico's Smer-SD returned to power being the first party since the breakup of Czechoslovakia to win an absolute majority of seats. Fico initially sought to form a national unity government with SDKU or KDH, but when this failed he formed the first one-party government in Slovakia since 1993.

2014 presidential election 

On 18 December 2013, Fico officially announced his candidacy for the upcoming presidential election in 2014. "I understand my candidacy as a service to Slovakia," Fico said on December 18. He argued that he did not see his candidacy as an adventure, an escape or an attempt to culminate his political career.
His campaign ran under the motto "Ready for Slovakia." On 9 January 2014, the Slovak Parliament, under Speaker Pavol Paška, officially approved the candidatures of Fico and 14 other candidates.

However, Fico was defeated by the independent candidate Andrej Kiska, whose support from the right wing of Slovak politics led him to victory by a wide margin (approximately 59%–41%) in the second round of voting on 29 March 2014.

2016 parliamentary election 

Fico's party won the 2016 parliamentary elections, amassing a plurality of seats, but failed to win a majority. On 7 March 2016, President of Slovakia Andrej Kiska invited each elected party, with the exception of Kotleba – People's Party Our Slovakia, for post-election talks. Fico was given the first opportunity by the President to form a stable coalition. On 17 March, incumbent Fico informed president Andrej Kiska that he would form a four-party government coalition, including Smer–SD, the Slovak National Party, Most–Híd and Network, which together held 85 of the 150 seats.

Resignation 

On 14 March 2018, Fico publicly stated that he was ready to tender his resignation as prime minister in order to avoid an early election as well as to "solve the political crisis" involving the murder of investigative journalist Ján Kuciak, who was writing stories on tax frauds and alleged cronies of the ruling party. Kuciak also examined the work of the Italian mafia 'Ndrangheta in Slovakia. According to the police, Mária Trošková, who is an assistant to Robert Fico, could have ties to 'Ndrangheta. Fico's announcement came after a meeting with President Kiska. In that meeting, Fico laid out a number of specific conditions that needed to be met by the president in order for him to resign. Those conditions were amongst others; that the result of the 2016 Slovak parliamentary election be respected, that the current ruling government coalition must continue, and lastly, that Smer-SD as the largest party currently in parliament name the next prime minister. Fico stated that he already had a candidate in mind; Slovak media widely reported that the next prime minister would be Deputy Prime Minister Peter Pellegrini. On 15 March, President Kiska formally accepted the resignation of prime minister Fico and his cabinet, and thereby tasked Pellegrini with forming a new government.

Domestic policy 
A large part of Fico's election victory in 2006 was attributed to his loud criticism of the previous right-wing government's economic, tax, social, pension and legislative reforms. The reforms were generally perceived as very positive and successful by such international bodies as the International Monetary Fund, the World Bank or the OECD. However, the reforms negatively affected large segments of the population, particularly low wage earners, the unemployed, and welfare and other social assistance recipients. While in opposition, and more vocally during the election campaign, Fico vowed to reverse and cancel the majority of these reforms. However, upon taking office Fico adopted a more cautious approach, as he wanted to ensure Slovakia could fulfill the Maastricht criteria required for Euro currency adoption. This was successful, and Slovakia adopted the Euro on 1 January 2009.

Labour policies 
Among the reforms Fico introduced, several established standards as to how many times employees could be kept on as temporary workers instead of being given permanent contracts. Under legislation of the Mikuláš Dzurinda government, an employer could keep new staff as temps and create a two-tier workforce, which many did. Slovakia's labor policies are now generally in tune with most other EU states.

At the start of his second term as Prime Minister in 2012, Fico introduced a new "Labour Code," which granted entitlement to a lay-off notice period as well as severance pay, reduced overtime, making layoffs more expensive for employers, shorter temporary work contracts and more power for trade unions. In addition, it curbed the ‘chaining’ of fixed-term employment contracts, whereby currently it is possible to extend a fixed-term employment contract three times over three years. The Code was revised in 2014 when it introduced severe restrictions of the work on agreement performed outside regular employment. Under the latest revision, employers will be able to conclude agreements with employees for 12 months only.

In 2010, Fico faced large-scale protests and a blockade of major cities by truckers upset about what they considered to be badly implemented tolls on the highways. Truckers demanded that fuel prices be lowered to compensate for the tolls. Fico initially refused to speak with representatives of the truckers, saying he would not "be blackmailed", but a few days later capitulated. The cuts given to truckers will amount to about €100,000,000.

Finance 
One of few modifications Fico's government did implement was a slight modification to the unusual flat tax system introduced by the previous government, in a way that slightly decreased or eradicated a tax-free part of income for higher income earners. A lower value added tax was imposed on medications and books, though in spite of his election promises Fico failed to extend this onto a wider group of products such as groceries. Among the measures were controversial legislative changes which effectively banned private health insurance companies from generating profit. As a result, Slovakia is being sued by several foreign shareholders of local health insurers through international arbitrations. In 2007, Fico unsuccessfully tried to regulate retail food prices, an unprecedented effort in a generally free market European Union.

In August 2008, Fico threatened the foreign shareholders of a local gas distributor SPP, the French Gaz de France and the German E.ON, with nationalization and seizure of their ownership shares in a dispute over retail gas prices.

Foreign policy

European Union 

In foreign relations with Europe, Fico's government faced controversies due to its affiliation with the internationally isolated parties of Vladimír Mečiar and Ján Slota. Under his leadership however, Slovakia entered the Eurozone in 2009, and Fico himself in a speech to the Oxford Union praised Slovakia's entry into the European Union as a "success story." Fico opposed the unilateral declaration of independence by Kosovo, which he called a "major mistake," as a result of which Slovakia has not recognised Kosovo as a sovereign state.

Responding to the 2013 Euromaidan protests in Ukraine, Fico declared that the "EU is no religious obligation" as well as that the EU was "so in love with itself" that it is convinced there is no better alternative to it in the world. He subsequently condemned the use of violence, but acknowledged that the protests were an internal affair in Ukraine.

Commenting on Brexit in November 2016, he stated that it wasn't clear what the United Kingdom wanted, adding that it "must suffer" more than the 27 countries who will remain in the bloc. He also stated that the UK will not be allowed to make EU workers "second-class citizens" while still receiving the benefits of the single market. In light of election of Donald Trump, he commented that it might spur Europe to bolster its military.

In August 2017, Fico said: "The fundamentals of my policy are being close to the (EU) core, close to France, to Germany. I am very much interested in regional cooperation within the Visegrad Four but Slovakia's vital interest is the EU."

Immigration and Islam 
Fico rejected European Commission's plan to distribute refugees and economic migrants from the Middle East and Africa among EU member states, saying: "As long as I am prime minister, mandatory quotas will not be implemented on Slovak territory." He has subsequently sought to associate refugees and Muslims with terrorism, claiming that "thousands of terrorists and Islamic State fighters are entering Europe with migrants" and stating that "We monitor every single Muslim in Slovakia." In May 2016, he stated that Slovakia will not accept "one single Muslim" migrant into the country, weeks before the country was scheduled to take over the presidency of EU. He further stated "When I say something now, maybe it will seem strange, but I'm sorry, Islam has no place in Slovakia. I think it is the duty of politicians to talk about these things very clearly and openly. I do not wish there were tens of thousands of Muslims."

On 30 November 2016 The Slovak parliament under Fico government passed a bill that requires all religious movements and organizations to have a minimum of 50,000 verified practicing members in order to become state-recognized up from 20,000.

Russia 

Compensating for his lack of close political allies within the EU (the former head of the Czech Social Democratic Party, Jiří Paroubek, being a notable exception), Fico sought to strengthen relations with several non-EU countries such as Serbia and Russia. This broke with a pro-NATO, Western-focused trend established after the 1998 Slovak election.

After coming to power in 2006, Fico declared that Slovakia's relations with Russia would improve after eight years of "neglect." Fico referred to "Slavonic solidarity," which was a central theme of the Slovak National Awakening in the 1850s. On April 4, 2008, during a visit by Russian Prime Minister Viktor Zubkov, Fico said: "In Slovakia, there have been efforts to deliberately ignore Slavonic solidarity." Slovakia modernised Russian MiG fighters in Russia and did not buy new jets from the West. Additionally, Fico accused Georgia of provoking Russia when attacking South Ossetia in the 2008 Russia–Georgia war. Under his premiership, the Slovak foreign ministry rejected the Crimean referendum which incorporated Crimea into Russia. Fico himself, however, remained silent on the issue. Regarding the EU sanctions against Russia in 2014, Fico denounced them as "senseless," and a "threat to the Slovak economy."

Hungary 

Tension between Slovakia and Hungary, unstable from the past, was inflamed in 2006 following the parliamentary election and Fico's decision to include nationalist Ján Slota and his Slovak National Party into his governing coalition. Slota was known for his fierce anti-Hungarian rhetoric, including that "Hungarians are a tumor on the Slovak nation that needs to be immediately removed." In the wake of the election several incidents occurred which further inflamed nationalist sentiment on both sides, including the alleged beating of a Hungarian woman in South Slovakia. Fico reacted by condemning the extremism, but rebuked the Hungarian government by declaring "The Slovak government doesn't need to be called on to strike against extremism."  The row heated up again in September 2007, when Fico's government introduced a law making the Beneš decrees inviolable. This was in response to demands from ethnic Hungarian politicians that compensations should be made to persons affected by the decrees.

In May 2008, Fico labelled Hungary a potential threat during a speech commemorating the 161st anniversary of the day that Slovaks demanded national equality with other nations within the Austro-Hungarian Monarchy. Fico used the anniversary to openly criticise the political situation in Hungary and warn about the influence it might have on Slovakia. Especially he warned against the Hungarian right-wing politician Viktor Orbán, and his party Fidesz, which he called an "extreme nationalist party." Since then, however, relations between the two countries have slightly improved.

United States 

Fico was a vocal opponent of the one-time planned construction of new U.S. anti-ballistic missile and radar systems in military bases in neighbouring Czech Republic and Poland and one of his first steps upon taking office was a military pullout from Iraq. In November 2013, Fico visited the U.S. President Barack Obama in Washington D.C., where they spoke about the US-Slovak partnership, which is "based on shared democratic values and principles," after which he affirmed the strategic partnership between the two countries.

Relationship with the media 
In 2022, Fico repeatedly stated that journalists were an "organized criminal group with the aim of breaking Slovak statehood" and called on the Slovak Police Force to investigate them. In November 2021, he described journalists as "Soros's corrupt gang of swines for whom water is already boiling." He proclaims that the media is "obsessed" with him and his party, they want to "destroy" it and are "waging a jihad against it."

After the 2020 parliamentary election, Fico appears frequently in far-right media, spreading Russian propaganda, Soros conspiracy theories and anti-vax stances. In April 2021, he appeared on ZVTV, whose editor-in-chief Tibor Rostas is convicted of defamation of a nation, race, and religion.

During his press conferences he often verbally attacks, belittles and taunts the present journalists, often accusing them of bias and attacks on his government. On several occasions he has openly and on record used profanities against specific journalists ("idiots," "pricks, "prostitutes", "snakes", "hyenas"). He has also been recorded ridiculing journalists' physical appearance. In 2009, Fico repeatedly described the Slovak press as a "new opposition force" that was biased and was harming national and state interests. Fico also accused the press of failing to "stand behind the common people." In November 2016, he termed journalists questioning him about allegations of public procurement rules during Slovakia's EU presidency, as "dirty, anti-Slovak prostitutes." He also claimed the accusations were a targeted attack to smear the country's presidency of EU.

In July 2012 Fico declared "Eternal Peace" between him and the Slovak press. He also stated his desire to change his attitude towards the media, saying "I think it is enough" and that he does not plan any further lawsuits against media outlets except in extraordinary situations. Fico further said: "You have to spend an incredible amount of energy on it [lawsuits], it means several years of conflict, one conflict takes usually five or six years [to resolve]," adding that lawsuits involve "legal fees, paying a lawyer, everything around that."

Personal life 
Fico is married to Svetlana Ficová (née Svobodová), a lawyer and associate professor from Žilina. They were classmates while both were studying law at the Comenius University in Bratislava, and they married in 1988. They have one son together, Michal, who studied at the University of Economics in Bratislava. In addition to his native Slovak, Fico speaks fluent Czech, English and Russian.

Religion 
Fico has rarely discussed in public his religious life. In his application to join the Communist Party in 1984, Fico stated that he was "strictly atheistic," as was required in order to be accepted. According to the testimonial from college added to the application, he held a "scientific Marxist-Leninist worldview" and "no problems with regards to religion."

In a promotional video during presidential election campaign in 2014, Fico said he grew up in a Roman Catholic family and that he considers himself a Catholic. He discussed his baptism, holy communion, confirmation and how the Catholic faith had impacted his childhood. He stated: "Perhaps if I am to do my profile in relation to the Catholic Church, I would end up better off than any MP of the KDH." He also described growing up with his grandfather, a man who "very strictly respected the rules of standard Christian life," stating that it profoundly impacted him. However, historian and former researcher of the National Memory Institute Patrik Dubovský consider it being an attempt to manipulate public opinion, because "confirmation was in direct conflict with Communist Party membership, which political programme was based on atheism." As Dubovský stated, religiously active people were severely persecuted, especially after the Charta 77 incident.

During televised debate Fico refused to answer a television presenter's question about whether he is a Christian (Catholic) or an Atheist, and said that he considered it a private matter. Regarding his baptism, holy communion and confirmation, Fico said that he was baptised as an infant and the holy communion with confirmation followed afterwards, as it was with every child who grew up in his home village, according to him.

Alleged extramarital affairs 
In August 2010, Fico was photographed around midnight in a gay bar in downtown Bratislava together with a woman, who was later revealed to be 25-year-old Jana Halászová, a secretary at the Smer-SD party headquarters. It was later revealed that Halászová had been given extensive privileges, including her own parking space in the Parliament car park, without being a member. Halászová had also bought a luxurious car worth around €30,000 and bought a new flat without a mortgage in August 2012 in a neighbourhood where a one-room flat costs approximately €100,000, despite being a secretary without education. In addition, both her sister and step-mother had recently been given jobs within various ministries.

In August 2013, Fico was photographed while embracing and kissing his now-secretary Halászová, after taking her for a private dinner at a chateau in Čereňany, 160 kilometres from Bratislava.  The photos created another round of speculation about the true nature of their relationship as well as whether or not he had used public funds to pay for the dinner. A month later, the tabloid 7 Plus reported that Fico and Halászová had been photographed together in a luxury restaurant while vacationing together in the Croatian town of Opatija. In response to this latest story, Fico filed a defamation lawsuit against 7 Plus magazine.

In March 2018, after murder of Jan Kuciak, Slovak investigative journalist Eugen Korda in interview for public Česká televize TV alleged that Mária Trošková, Fico's assistant, is also his lover. Trošková escorted Fico on multiple high-level diplomatic meetings, including a summit with Angela Merkel.

Subsequently, direct connection between Mária Trošková and convicted 'Ndrangheta member Antonino Vadala was revealed by the press. While her romantic connection to Fico was not confirmed, her former relationship with Vadala was. Despite the evidence Fico was publicly supporting Trošková and the secretary of the Security Council Viliam Jasaň. After the public outrage, Trošková abandoned her position as State Counsellor and Fico's assistant and disappeared from the public eye.

In 2020, Slovak daily newspaper Denník N identified Katarína Szalayová as Fico's lover. She used a luxury car worth around €40,000, even though her net monthly salary of the prosecution office employee was around €600. After leaving the prosecution office, Szalayová gained employment in the law firm of Robert Kaliňák, former deputy prime minister during Fico's cabinets and incumbent member of SMER –SD party presidium.

Notes

References

External links
The Fico Threat, by Martin M. Simecka (March 2009 essay) 
 Fico profile

|-

1964 births
Living people
Comenius University alumni
Academic staff of Comenius University
Alumni of University College London
Alumni of the UCL School of Slavonic and East European Studies
Communist Party of Czechoslovakia politicians
Direction – Social Democracy politicians
Slovak Roman Catholics
Members of the National Council (Slovakia) 1992-1994
Members of the National Council (Slovakia) 1994-1998
Members of the National Council (Slovakia) 1998-2002
Members of the National Council (Slovakia) 2002-2006
Members of the National Council (Slovakia) 2010-2012
Members of the National Council (Slovakia) 2016-2020
Members of the National Council (Slovakia) 2020-present
Party of the Democratic Left (Slovakia) politicians
People from Topoľčany
Prime Ministers of Slovakia
Slovak communists
Candidates for President of Slovakia